Chunwang may refer to:

 "Chunwang" (poem), an 8th-century poem by Du Fu
 Chunwang (place), a village in Nepal